Indara Junction is a railway station in the Mau district of Azamgarh division of Uttar Pradesh, India. Indara Junction is under the Varanasi division of the North Eastern Railway zone of Indian Railways. There are two platforms. Dohrighat was connected to Indara Junction through metre gauge. There is no railway operation on Indara–Dohrighat railway line due to the conversion of metre-gauge into broad-gauge line. It is well connected to major cities like Varanasi, Allahabad, Kanpur and Gorakhpur.

References

Railway stations in Mau district